The Rink also known as The Link, is a historic apartment building located at Indianapolis, Indiana.  It was built in 1901, and is a seven-story, six bay by six bay, Renaissance Revival style brick and terra cotta building on a raised basement.  The main entrance corner features fluted Ionic order pilasters that extend from the third to the sixth story.

It was listed on the National Register of Historic Places in 1983.

References

External links

Apartment buildings in Indiana
Residential buildings on the National Register of Historic Places in Indiana
Residential buildings completed in 1901
Renaissance Revival architecture in Indiana
Residential buildings in Indianapolis
National Register of Historic Places in Indianapolis